St. Elizabeth of Hungary Roman Catholic Church is a historic church at 1024-1028 E. Burnett Street in Louisville, Kentucky.  It was completed in 1915 and added to the National Register of Historic Places in 1982.

It was designed by architect Fred T. Erhart (1870-1951).

References

Roman Catholic churches completed in 1915
20th-century Roman Catholic church buildings in the United States
Churches on the National Register of Historic Places in Kentucky
Neoclassical architecture in Kentucky
Roman Catholic churches in Louisville, Kentucky
National Register of Historic Places in Louisville, Kentucky
1915 establishments in Kentucky
Neoclassical church buildings in the United States